Sir Herbert Aubrey Francis Metcalfe  (1883–1957) was an administrator in British India. He was commissioned into the Royal Munster Fusiliers in 1903 and joined the ICS in 1908. In 1917, he was commissioned a Temporary Lieutenant in the 5th Punjab Light Horse of the British Indian Army. In 1922, he was appointed Member Fourth Class of the Royal Victorian Order and was appointed a CIE in 1928 and a CSI in 1933. In 1936, Metcalfe was knighted with the KCIE. He served as Chief Commissioner of Balochistan from 1939 to 1943.

Titles
1883-1922: Herbert Aubrey Francis Metcalfe
1922-1928: Herbert Aubrey Francis Metcalfe, MVO
1928-1933: Herbert Aubrey Francis Metcalfe, CIE, MVO
1933-1936: Herbert Aubrey Francis Metcalfe, CSI, CIE, MVO
1936-1957: Sir Herbert Aubrey Francis Metcalfe, KCIE, CSI, MVO

References
METCALFE, Sir (Herbert) Aubrey (Francis), Who Was Who, A & C Black, 1920–2015 (online edition, Oxford University Press, 2014)

1883 births
1957 deaths
People educated at Charterhouse School
Alumni of Christ Church, Oxford
Indian Civil Service (British India) officers
Knights Commander of the Order of the Indian Empire
Companions of the Order of the Star of India
Lieutenants of the Royal Victorian Order
British people in colonial India